Nam Dip is a tambon (subdistrict) of Pa Sang District, in Lamphun Province, Thailand. In 2015 it had a population of 9,592 people.

Administration

Central administration
The tambon is subdivided into 17 administrative villages (mubans).

Local administration
The whole area of the subdistrict is covered by the subdistrict administrative organization (SAO) Nam Dip (องค์การบริหารส่วนตำบลน้ำดิบ).

References

External links
Thaitambon.com on Nam Dip

Tambon of Lamphun province
Populated places in Lamphun province